Wade Andrew Williams (born December 24, 1961) is an American actor. He is known for his various character roles, and for a major supporting role as correctional officer Brad Bellick on the Fox television series Prison Break and Father Cronin on The Bernie Mac Show (2001–2004). Williams also voiced Two-Face in Batman: The Dark Knight Returns (2012–2013).

Life and career
Williams was born in Tulsa, Oklahoma. He studied theatre at the University of Tulsa. He began his acting career at the Delacorte Theater in Central Park in The Taming of the Shrew with Morgan Freeman and Tracey Ullman. Williams also had a role with Denzel Washington in Richard III. Williams then continued with performances on and off Broadway and toured nationally in productions such as Guys and Dolls, Les Misérables, Kiss of the Spider Woman, Ragtime, and Show Boat. 

His film credits include Flicka, Collateral, Ali and Erin Brockovich. Additionally, Williams has also appeared on television in series such as Charmed, Over There, Six Feet Under, 24, NYPD Blue, CSI and as Father Cronin on The Bernie Mac Show.

From 2005 to 2008, Williams starred as Brad Bellick, leader of the correctional officers at Fox River State Penitentiary in Prison Break. He appeared in The Dark Knight Rises (2012) as the warden of Blackgate Prison.

He guest starred on an episode of the 8th season of Monk. He also took part in the music video "Welcome to My Truth" of American singer-songwriter Anastacia.

He and his wife Emma have a daughter and live in Dallas.

Filmography

Film

Television

In 2021 Williams played 'fad' Jet Black's partner in Netflix adaptation of Cowboy Bebop

Video games

External links

1961 births
Living people
University of Tulsa alumni
Rutgers University alumni
American male film actors
American male television actors
American male voice actors
Male actors from Tulsa, Oklahoma